Ukuwela (Sinhala:උකුවෙල, Tamil:உக்குவளை) is a suburb of Matale, Sri Lanka. It is located in Matale District, Central Province.

Demographics 
Ukuwela is a multi-religious area. The area has a Buddhist majority with a large Muslim population and significant Hindus and Christians.
Source:statistics.gov.lk

Topography 
Ukuwela is located in the mountainous and thickly forested interior of the island and overlooked by Knuckles Mountain Range.

Climate 
Ukuwela's climate is classified as tropical. Ukuwela is an area with a significant rainfall. Even in the driest month there is a lot of rain. The climate here is classified as Af by the Köppen-Geiger system. The wet season has a rainfall peak around September, the dry season is around the month of February.

Ukuwela has no distinct temperature seasons, the temperature is relatively constant during the year. The temperatures at night are cooler than during daytime. March is on average the month with most sunshine. Ukuwela has a humid (> 0.65 p/pet) climate.

Natural Vegetation  
The land area is not cultivated, most of the natural vegetation is still intact. The landscape is mostly covered with closed to open broadleaved evergreen or semi-deciduous forest. The climate is classified as a tropical monsoon (short dry season, monsoon rains other months), with a tropical moist forest biozone .

Soil
The soil in the area is high in lixisols (lx), soil with clay-enriched lower horizon, low cec, and high saturation of bases.

Transport

Bus
Ukuwela has a public transport system based primarily on buses.

Rail

Ukuwela is served by Sri Lanka Railways' Matale Line and is connected by rail to Matale and Kandy.

Banks
There are four public banks operating in Ukuwela.
 People's Bank
 Bank Of Ceylon
 Sanasa Development Bank
 Rural Bank

Sports 
S. B. Yalegama Stadium is the main sporting venue in Ukuwela.

Education 
Main Schools 
 Ajmeer National School, Ukuwela
 Nagolla Sidhartha M.M.V., Ukuwela
 Kuriwela Hameedia College

Ukuwela Power station 

See also
List of towns in Central Province, Sri Lanka

References

External links

Divisional Secretariat Ukuwela 

Populated places in Matale District
Grama Niladhari divisions of Sri Lanka